Glückauf may refer to

 Glück auf, the traditional German miners' greeting
Glückauf-Kampfbahn, a sports stadium in Gelsenkirchen, Germany
, a number of ships with this name.
Eugen Glueckauf (1906 – 1981), German-born British expert on nuclear power